The 1986 Asian Junior Women's Volleyball Championship was held in Bangkok, Thailand from 18 October to 25 October 1986

Preliminary round

Pool A

|}

|}

Pool B

|}

|}

Final round

Classification 5th–8th

|}

|}

Championship

|}

|}

Final standing

References
Results (Archived 2014-10-15)

1986 in women's volleyball
Volleyball
International volleyball competitions hosted by Thailand
1986
1986 in youth sport